The Commonwealth Railways K class was a class of 2-8-0 freight locomotives built in 1916 by North British Locomotive Company, United Kingdom, for the Commonwealth Railways, Australia.

History
In order to operate freight trains on the then under construction Trans-Australian Railway, Commonwealth Railways ordered eight locomotives of the same design as the New South Wales Government Railways' T class (later the D50 class), but with higher capacity tenders.

All were delivered between March and June 1916. Most had been withdrawn by the early 1950s with the last withdrawn in March 1952 after dieselisation.

References

Notes

Bibliography

K class
NBL locomotives
Railway locomotives introduced in 1916
2-8-0 locomotives
Standard gauge locomotives of Australia
Scrapped locomotives
Freight locomotives